Nsenga, also known as Senga, is a Bantu language of Zambia, Malawi and Mozambique, occupying an area on the plateau that forms the watershed between the Zambezi and Luangwa river systems and Western Malawi land overshadowing Kachebere mountain called Mchinji.

The urban form of Nyanja spoken in the Zambian capital Lusaka has many features of Nsenga.

References

External links
Malombelo a Kamo Kamo Occasional (Pastoral) Offices in Nsenga (1956) Anglican liturgical material digitized by Richard Mammana and Charles Wohlers

Languages of Zambia
Languages of Mozambique
Languages of Zimbabwe
Nyasa languages